The 1987 season was the Hawthorn Football Club's 63rd season in the Victorian Football League and 86th overall. Hawthorn entered the season as the defending VFL Premiers.

Fixture

Premiership season

Finals series

Ladder

References

Hawthorn Football Club seasons